Lake Creek Precinct, formerly township, is Congressional Township 8 South, Range 3 East of the Third Principal Meridian located in Williamson County, Illinois. It is named for Lake Creek. The largest community within the precinct is Johnston City, Illinois.

Incorporated communities located at least partially in the precinct today are Johnston City, Whiteash and Pittsburg. It is also home to the former country store and post office at Halfway, Illinois

References

Townships in Williamson County, Illinois
Precincts in Illinois